Lightfishes are small stomiiform fishes in the family Phosichthyidae

The earliest fossils of lightfishes are from Oligocene-aged Paratethyan marine strata in the Czech Republic.

They are very small fishes found in oceans throughout the world: most species grow no longer than 10 cm, while those in the genus Vinciguerria only reach 4 cm or so.

They make up for their small size with abundant numbers: Vinciguerria is thought — with the possible exception of Cyclothone — to be the most abundant genus of vertebrates. Deep-sea trawls of the Humboldt Current in the southeast Pacific have found that lightfishes make up 85% by mass of mesopelagic fishes, with Vinciguerria lucetia by far the most numerous species.

They are bioluminescent fishes, possessing rows of photophores along their sides, with which they hunt planktonic invertebrates, especially krill.

Generally, Phosichthidae have been noted to feed on two types of fish including Copepods and Amphipods. Copepods are small, deep-sea crustaceans that are easily hunted by Phosichthyidae. Amphipods are similar to Copepods because they are also smaller relatives of another species: shrimp.

References

 
Marine fish families
Ray-finned fish families